Kang Je-gyu (born December 23, 1962) is a South Korean film director.

Career
After graduating from ChungAng University, Kang received his first prize at the Korea Youth Film Festival and Korea Scenario Awards in 1991.

Kang's most notable contributions to Korean cinema have been Shiri and Taegukgi. Shiri was the first big budget Hollywood-style action film made in Korea, which broke box office records and was partially responsible for the popularization of domestic films in the country. Taegukgi, directed five years later, again rewrote box office records, having been seen by over ten million people in South Korea alone.

After establishing his own production film company under his name, he merged it with Myung Films in 2004, forming MK Pictures.

In an interview for the BBC special Asian Invasion, Kang revealed that he wanted his next project to be a science fiction film.  He said, "I have produced two movies about Korea. So now I'm preparing a new movie that is related to something more global--a problem that the whole world is facing right now."

After a 7-year hiatus, in 2011 Kang unveiled his film My Way, set during World War II with a star-studded pan-Asian cast and the highest budget to date for a Korean film.<ref>{{cite web | url = http://english.kbs.co.kr/news/entertainment_news_view.html?No=8016 | title = Kang Je Kyu: 'I Devoted My Passion to 'My Way | publisher = KBS Global | date = 2011-12-16 | access-date = 2013-03-17 | archive-url = https://web.archive.org/web/20140407083157/http://english.kbs.co.kr/news/entertainment_news_view.html?No=8016 | archive-date = 2014-04-07 | url-status = dead }}</ref>

Filmography
As directorGingko Bed (1996)Shiri (1999)Taegukgi (2004)My Way (2011)Awaiting (2014) (short film)Salut d'Amour (2015)Road to Boston (2023)

As writerWell, Let's Look at the Sky Sometimes - 1990Who Saw the Dragon's Claws - 1991Days of Roses - 1994Rules of the Game - 1994Legend of Gingko 2 (1996)Lament (1997)Shiri (1999)Taegukgi (2004)Iris (2009)My Way (2011)Awaiting (2014) (short film)Salut d'Amour (2015)Road to Boston (2023)

As producerThe Legend of Gingko (2000)Kiss Me Much (2001)Iris (2009)My Way (2011)Bad Guys Always Die (2015)Road to Boston'' (2023)

See also
List of Korean film directors
Cinema of Korea
Contemporary culture of South Korea

References

External links

 Detailed information about Kang Je-gyu at the KMDb 

1962 births
Living people
South Korean film directors
Best Director Paeksang Arts Award (film) winners
Grand Prize Paeksang Arts Award (Film) winners